The Abbot of Inchaffray, before 1221 Prior of Inchaffray, and then by the end of the 15th century, the Commendator of Inchaffray, was the head of the community of Augustinian canons of Inchaffray Abbey and their lands. Inchaffray is in Strathearn, in southern Perthshire, Scotland. The house was founded by Gille Brigte (Gilbert), mormaer of Strathearn in 1200 as a priory and was elevated to an abbey in 1221. By the late 15th century the monastery was becoming secularized. and after the resignation of Abbot George Mureff (Murray) in 1495, Laurence, Lord Oliphant, took over as commendator and thereafter it was held by commendators. It was turned into a secular lordship for Commendator James Drummond, Lord Maddertie, but the final formalization of the lordship did not come until 1669, when it was given to William Drummond.

List of priors of Inchaffray
 Maol Íosa, 1200
 John, 1212x1214
 Alpín (Elphin),  1219–1220
 Innocent, 1220–1221

List of abbots of Inchaffray

 Innocent (continuing as abbot), 1221-1235x
 Nicholas, 1239–1240
 Alan, 1258–1271
 Hugh, 1284–1292
 Thomas, 1296
 Maurice, 1304 x 1305–1322
 Cristin, 1322–x 1358
 John, 1358–1363
 William (I), 1363
 Symon de Scone, x 1365
 John, 1365
 William (II), 1370
 John de Kelly, 1373
 William de Culross, 1380–1387
 William Franklyn, 1399–1414
 Patrick de Lome, 1414
 Donald (?de Dunfermline), 1417–1430
 John Lange, 1429
 John de Treloch, 1429–1430
 Robert Beaton, 1430
 William de Crannach, 1430–1433
 John de Moravia, 1435–1445
 Nicholas Fethkill, 1458–1462
 George Mureff (Murray), 1458–1492/5
 William Haddington, 1463–1482

List of commendators of Inchaffray

 Laurence Oliphant, 1495–1513
 Peter Accoltis, 1513–1514
 Alexander Stewart de Pitcairne, 1514–1537
 Gavin Dunbar, 1538–1547
 John Hamilton, 1547–1551
 Alexander Gordon, 1551–1566
 James Drummond, 1565–1610

Notes

Bibliography
 Cowan, Ian B. & Easson, David E., Medieval Religious Houses: Scotland With an Appendix on the Houses in the Isle of Man, Second Edition, (London, 1976), p. 91
 Lindsay, William Alexander, Dowden, John & Thomson, John Maitland (eds.), Charters of Inchaffray Abbey, 1190-1609, Publications of the Scottish History Society, Volume LVI, (Edinburgh, 1908), pp. 249-57
 Watt, D.E.R. & Shead, N.F. (eds.), The Heads of Religious Houses in Scotland from the 12th to the 16th Centuries, The Scottish Records Society, New Series, Volume 24, (Edinburgh, 2001), p. 101-05

See also
 Viscount Strathallan

Canonical Augustinian abbots and priors
Scottish abbots